Josef Brendle (born 8 June 1949) is a Liechtenstein sports shooter. He competed in the men's 10 metre air rifle event at the 1992 Summer Olympics.

References

External links
 

1949 births
Living people
Liechtenstein male sport shooters
Olympic shooters of Liechtenstein
Shooters at the 1992 Summer Olympics
Place of birth missing (living people)